The AURORA Music Festival (also referred to as the Clark Hot Air Balloon Music, Arts and Food Festival) is an annual music and arts festival featuring live music, food, art installations, and hot air balloons held in Clark Global City in Pampanga, Philippines over the course of two days.

Background

First edition and COVID-19 pandemic 
The inaugural year of the Aurora Music Festival was initially scheduled to take place in the summer of 2020 but was postponed because of the COVID-19 outbreak. 

It was then announced that the festival will be held on June 10-11, 2022, two years since the original date. The organizers assured ticket holders that the performers are still the same as previously announced, and that the tickets purchased before are still valid. 

The festival will feature hot air balloons display along with live music performances by local artists and bands.

Confusion with the PIHABF 
The Aurora Music Festival is held in Clark Global City, inside the Clark Freeport Zone where the Philippine International Hot Air Balloon Fiesta (PIHABF) is also held since 1994 before they moved to Carmona, Cavite for its 2020 edition. When the music festival was announced, it created a confusion with it being held at the same place and involved hot air balloon.

On April 13, 2022, the organizing committee of PIHABF released a statement to clarify that their event is different from the Clark Hot Air Balloon Music, Arts and Food Festival (AURORA Music Festival), and that they do not have any association with the organization and the management of the said event.

Lineups

References

External links 

 Aurora Music Festival official website

Music festivals in the Philippines